Hoaglin Township is one of the twelve townships of Van Wert County, Ohio, United States.  The 2000 census reported 605 people in the township.

Geography
Located in the northern part of the county, it borders the following townships:
Latty Township, Paulding County - north
Jackson Township - east
Washington Township - southeast corner
Ridge Township - south
Pleasant Township - southwest corner
Union Township - west
Blue Creek Township, Paulding County - northwest corner

No municipalities are located within Hoaglin Township.

Name and history
It is the only Hoaglin Township statewide.

Government
The township is governed by a three-member board of trustees, who are elected in November of odd-numbered years to a four-year term beginning on the following January 1. Two are elected in the year after the presidential election and one is elected in the year before it. There is also an elected township fiscal officer, who serves a four-year term beginning on April 1 of the year after the election, which is held in November of the year before the presidential election. Vacancies in the fiscal officership or on the board of trustees are filled by the remaining trustees.

References

External links
County website

Townships in Van Wert County, Ohio
Townships in Ohio